The list of radio stations in North Korea lists all the national and regional radio stations in North Korea.

Radio is the most commonly used broadcast media in North Korea. All stations are subject to the strict control of the government and carry no advertising. Some of the transmitters carry regional programmes in the afternoons, but usually relay the central programme from Pyongyang.

There are five North Korean radio networks:
Korean Central Broadcasting Station: the main domestic full service radio network, primarily broadcast on mediumwave with some FM and shortwave transmitters
: FM-only, domestic music network
: an "all-Korea" service primarily aimed at South Koreans and ethnic Koreans in China, broadcast on mediumwave and widely available on FM and shortwave
Echo of Unification / Tongil Voice: Propaganda station beamed to South Korea, Shortwave and FM frequencies close to the DMZ.
Voice of Korea, a multi-lingual shortwave broadcaster aimed at audiences worldwide, also available on mediumwave in the Pyongyang area
Noise jamming: blocking South Korean and other Korean language foreign broadcasts

Korean Central Broadcasting Station

Mediumwave
702 kHz, Chongjin (50 kW) (Shared with PBS during special programs, when VOK is on 621)
720 kHz, Kanggye (500 kW) (Shared with PBS overnight)
765 kHz, Hyesan (50 kW) (inactive)
810 kHz, Kaesong (50 kW) (Shared with PBS overnight, working with low power now)
819 kHz, Pyongyang (500 kW)
873 kHz, Sinuiju (250 kW) (Shared with PBS overnight)
882 kHz, Wonsan (250 kW)(irregular)
927 kHz, Sariwon (50 kW) (irregular)
999 kHz, Hamhung (250 kW)(irregular)
1080 kHz, Haeju (1500 kW)(inactive)

Shortwave
2350 kHz, Sariwon (5 kW) (inactive)
2850 kHz, Pyongyang (50 kW) (inactive as of May 2020)
3205 kHz, Pyongyang (100 kW) (DRM tests)
3220 kHz, Hamhung (5 kW) (bad modulation, shared with PBS overnight)
3250 kHz, Pyongyang (100kW)
3920 kHz, Hyesan (5 kW) (irregular)
3959 kHz, Kanggye (5 kW) (irregular)
3978 kHz, Chongjin (5 kW)
3985 kHz, Chongjin (10 kW) (irregular, bad modulation, drifting, probably for Jamming)
6100 kHz, Kanggye (250 kW)
6140 kHz, Pyongyang (250 kW) (DRM tests)
9665 kHz, Kanggye (50 kW)
11680 kHz, Kanggye (50 kW)

FM
88.5 MHz, Pyonggang (102 kW) New Radio Station
93.8 MHz, Pyongyang (50 kW)
102.3 MHz, Kaesong (2 kW)

Pyongyang Broadcasting Station

Mediumwave
621 kHz, Chongjin (500 kW) Shared with Voice of Korea Japanese service
657 kHz, Pyongyang (1500 kW)
801 kHz, Kimchaek (500 kW) (drifting)
855 kHz, Sangwon (1000 kW)
1053 kHz, Haeju (1000 kW) (inactive)

Shortwave
3320 kHz, Pyongyang (50 kW)
4557 kHz, Pyongyang (50 kW)
6160 kHz, Kanggye (50 kW) (sometimes irregular due power cuts, replaced 6400 kHz since March 23 2021)

FM
91.1 MHz, Kangson (0.19 kW)
96.7 MHz, Pyongyang (50 kW)
98.5 MHz, Pyongyang (50 kW) 
104.5 MHz, Pyongsong (2 kW)
103.5 MHz, Pyongyang (50 kW)
106.5 MHz, Pyongyang (50 kW)
92.9 MHz, Wonsan (5 kW)

89.2, 91.2, 93.3, 93.9, 94.5, 96.7, 97.3, 97.7, 98.1, 99.6 and 101.8 MHz, Unknown locations countrywide.

Pyongyang FM Broadcasting Station

Echo of Unification (Beamed to South Korea)

Voice of Korea

Mediumwave
621 kHz, Chongjin (500 kW) Japanese program only, shared with Pyongyang Broadcasting Station
1368 kHz, Pyongyang (irregular)

Shortwave

3560 kHz, Kujang (15 kW) (DRM tests, shared with KCBS and PBS, irregular)
6070 kHz, Kanggye (250 kW)
6170 kHz, Kujang (200 kW) (During winter)
6185 kHz, Kujang (200 kW)
7210 kHz, Kujang (200 kW)
7220 kHz, Kujang (200 kW)
7235 kHz, Kujang (200 kW)
7570 kHz, Kujang (200 kW) (During winter)
7580 kHz, Kujang (200 kW)
9425 kHz, Kujang (200 kW)
9435 kHz, Kujang (200 kW)
9445 kHz, Kujang (200 kW)
9650 kHz, Kujang (200 kW)
9730 kHz, Kujang (200 kW)
9850 kHz, Kujang (200 kW)
9875 kHz, Kujang (200 kW)
9890 kHz, Kujang (200 kW)
11635 kHz, Kujang (200 kW)
11645 kHz, Kujang (200 kW)
11710 kHz, Kujang (200 kW)
11735 kHz, Kujang (200 kW)
11865 kHz, Kujang (200 kW)
11910 kHz, Kujang (200 kW)
12015 kHz, Kujang (200 kW)
13650 kHz, Kujang (200 kW)
13760 kHz, Kujang (200 kW)
15105 kHz, Kujang (200 kW)
15180 kHz, Kujang (200 kW)
15245 kHz, Kujang (200 kW)

Noise jammer (blocking foreign broadcasts)
Strong, helicopter, boat engine-like "whooshing" noise. Use SDRs in Asia to locate them.

The whooshing noise often can be heard under Voice of Korea - the jammer is at the same site.

The swinging tone on 4450 kHz is often under KCBS Sinuiju on 873 kHz - the jammer is at the same site.

Shortwave:

3480 kHz, Wonsan (beeping, whistling tone)
3910 kHz, Kujang (200 kW)
3910 kHz, unknown location (beeping tone, to fill "dead-zone")
3930 kHz, Kujang (200 kW)
3930 kHz, unknown location (beeping tone, to fill "dead-zone")
3985 kHz, Kujang (200 kW)
3985 kHz, unknown location (whistling tone, to fill "dead-zone")
4450 kHz, Sinuiju (Swinging carrier, to fill "dead-zone")
4450 kHz, Kujang (200 kW)
4885 kHz, Kujang (200 kW)
5920 kHz, unknown location (beeping tones)
5995 kHz, Kujang (200 kW)
6015 kHz, Kujang (200 kW)
6015 kHz, unknown location (beeping tone, to fill "dead-zone")
6048 kHz, Kujang (200 kW)
6250 kHz, Kujang (200 kW)
6350 kHz, Kujang (200 kW)
6520 kHz, Kujang (200 kW)
6520 kHz, unknown location (beeping tone, to fill "dead-zone")
6600 kHz, Kujang (200 kW)
6600 kHz, unknown location (beeping tone, to fill "dead-zone")
7275 kHz, Kanggye
7355 kHz, Haeju
9100 kHz, unknown location (whistling tone)
+ various frequencies on various times from various locations, depending the Korean schedule of the blocked station.

Medium Wave:
558 kHz, Haeju area
603 kHz, Haeju area
639 kHz, Kaesong area
648 kHz, Kaesong area
711 kHz, Pyongyang and Kaesong area
756 kHz, Pyongyang area
792 kHz, Haeju area
819 kHz, Pyongyang area (nighttime KCBS sign off)
837 kHz, Kaesong area
891 kHz, Pyongyang area
900 kHz, Kaesong area
972 kHz, Pyongyang area
1134 kHz, Pyongyang area
1143 kHz, Pyongyang area
1431 kHz, Pyongyang area
1467 kHz, Wonsan area
1566 kHz, Pyongyang area

FM

89.1 MHz, Kaesong
90.3 MHz, Kaesong
91.1 MHz, Kaesong
91.5 MHz, Kaesong
93.1 MHz, Kaesong
93.9 MHz, Kaesong
94.5 MHz, Kaesong
95.9 MHz, Kaesong
96.3 MHz, Kaesong
96.7 MHz, Kaesong
97.3 MHz, Kaesong
98.1 MHz, Kaesong
98.7 MHz, Kaesong
99.5 MHz, Kaesong
101.7 MHz, Haeju
103.1 MHz, Kaesong
104.5 MHz, Kaesong
104.9 MHz, Kaesong
105.3 MHz, Kaesong
105.7 MHz, Kaesong
106.1 MHz, Kaesong
106.5 MHz, Kaesong
106.9 MHz, Kaesong
107.3 MHz, Kaesong
107.7 MHz, Kaesong

See also

Media of North Korea
List of radio stations in South Korea
Radio jamming in Korea
Voice of Korea

External links
Official North Korean Website for Voice of Korea 
Radio Pyongyang to launch website
Northkoreatech.org
Northkoreatech.org
Fmscan.org
Fmscan.org
Fmscan.org
Fmscan.org
Fmscan.org
Fmscan.org
Fmscan.org
Pyongyang Broadcasting Station  
Schedule and frequencies for Voice of Korea

Mass media in North Korea
Broadcasting in North Korea
Propaganda in North Korea
North Korea